Drslavice may refer to:

Drslavice (Uherské Hradiště District), village in the Zlín Region, Moravia
Drslavice (Prachatice District), village in the South Bohemian Region, Bohemia
Drslavice (Klatovy), a district of Klatovy, Bohemia